KENA-FM (104.1 FM) is a radio station licensed to serve the community of Hatfield, Arkansas. The station is owned by Ouachita Broadcasting, Inc., and airs a country music format.

The station was assigned the call sign KBII by the Federal Communications Commission on July 17, 1998. The station changed its call sign to KILX on February 16, 2001, and to KENA-FM on August 25, 2014.

References

External links
 Official Website
 

ENA-FM
Radio stations established in 2004
2004 establishments in Arkansas
Country radio stations in the United States
Polk County, Arkansas